Péter Kozma (5 September 1959 – 4 March 2017) was a Hungarian politician, member of the National Assembly (MP) from Fidesz Szabolcs-Szatmár-Bereg County Regional List from 1998 to 2006 and from 2010 to 2014.

Kozma served as Vice President of the General Assembly of Szabolcs-Szatmár-Bereg County between 2006 and 2010. He had been a member of the Constitutional, Judicial and Standing Orders Committee since 2006, therefore he participated in the drawing up of the new constitution in 2011. From 1 July 2014 to 15 January 2017, he served as Director of the Szabolcs-Szatmár-Bereg County Government Office.

He died on 4 March 2017, aged 57.

Personal life
He was married and had two children.

References

1959 births
2017 deaths
Fidesz politicians
Members of the National Assembly of Hungary (1998–2002)
Members of the National Assembly of Hungary (2002–2006)
Members of the National Assembly of Hungary (2010–2014)
People from Kisvárda